is a former Japanese football player and manager.

Career
Since July until December 2012 he coached the Northern Mariana Islands national team.

He has recorded 0-16 biggest defeat against Myanmar women's national team as Sri Lanka's head coach.

References

External links
Profile at Soccerway.com
Profile at Soccerpunter.com

1959 births
Living people
Nihon University alumni
Association football people from Miyagi Prefecture
Japanese footballers
Japanese football managers
Thespakusatsu Gunma managers
Expatriate football managers in the Northern Mariana Islands
Northern Mariana Islands national football team managers
Association footballers not categorized by position
Japanese expatriate sportspeople in the Northern Mariana Islands
Japanese expatriate sportspeople in Tajikistan
Japanese expatriate sportspeople in Sri Lanka